"Better Day" is a song by English rock band Ocean Colour Scene. The song was released as the third single from their third studio album, Marchin' Already, on 10 November 1997 and reached number nine on the UK Singles Chart.

Track listings

UK CD single
 "Better Day"
 "The Best Bet on Chinaski"
 "On and On"

UK 7-inch and cassette single
 "Better Day"
 "The Best Bet on Chinaski"

Japanese CD single
 "Better Day"
 "The Best Bet on Chinaski"
 "On and On"
 "The Day We Caught the Train" (acoustic)

Personnel
Personnel are taken from the Marchin' Already album booklet.
 Ocean Colour Scene – writing, production, recording, mixing
 Simon Fowler – vocals, guitar
 Steve Cradock – guitar, piano
 Damon Minchella – bass guitar
 Oscar Harrison – drums
 Brendan Lynch – production, recording, mixing
 Martyn "Max" Heyes – production

Charts

References

Ocean Colour Scene songs
1997 singles
1997 songs
MCA Records singles